Edward Henry was a police commissioner.

Edward Henry may also refer to:

Edward Lamson Henry (1841–1919), American genre painter
Ed Henry, White House correspondent for Fox News Channel
Ed Henry (Alabama politician), member of the Alabama House of Representatives
Ed Henry (Minnesota politician) (1921–2010), American Democratic politician and academic
E. Stevens Henry (1836–1921), U.S. Representative from Connecticut

See also

Henry (surname)